is a song recorded by Japanese singer Aimyon. It was released as her eleventh single, alongside "On a Cherry Blossom Night" on May 26, 2021, through Unborde and Warner Music Japan. It featured as a theme song of the Nippon TV's Saturday drama, Life's Punchline.

Background and release

On March 31, 2021, it was revealed that Aimyon's new song, titled "Till I Know What Love Is (I'm Never Gonna Die)" would be featured on Nippon TV's Saturday drama, Life's Punchline as a theme song and scheduled for release as a double A-side single with "On a Cherry Blossom Night" on May 26, a year after "Naked Heart". The accompanying music video, directed by Kodai Kobayashi, was released on YouTube on May 7, alongside digital release.

Track listing

CD single, digital download, streaming
  – 4:36
  – 4:34
  – 2:48
 "Till I Know What Love Is (I'm Never Gonna Die)" (instrumental) – 4:36
 "On a Cherry Blossom Night" (instrumental) – 4:33

Charts

Weekly charts

Monthly charts

Year-end charts

Certifications

Release history

References

External links
  

2021 singles
2021 songs
Aimyon songs
Japanese-language songs
Warner Music Japan singles
Unborde singles